This is a list of International Society for Magnetic Resonance in Medicine gold medal winners. (as of 2020)

 Joseph J.H. Ackerman (1992)
 Robert S. Balaban (1994)
 Peter A. Bandettini (2020)
 Zaver M. Bhujwalla (2019)
 Peter J. Basser (2008)
 Paul A. Bottomley (1989)
 William G. Bradley, Jr. (1989, 1993) awarded by both predecessor societies, SMRM and SMRI
 Thomas J. Brady (1992)
 Michael Brant-Zawadzki (1993)
 Jeff W. M. Bulte (2014)
 Graeme M. Bydder  (1987, 1992) awarded by both predecessor societies, SMRM and SMRI
 Britton Chance (1988)
 Lawrence E. Crooks (1986)
 W. Thomas Dixon (2013)
 Charles L. Dumoulin (1993)
 Robert R. Edelman (1994)
 William A. Edelstein (1990)
 Richard L. Ehman (1995)
 Richard R. Ernst (1983)
 Jens Frahm (1991)
 Michael Garwood (2007)
 Jerry D. Glickson (2011)
 Gary H. Glover (2000)
 John C. Gore (2004)
 John R. Griffiths (2011)
 Mark Griswold (2017)
 Robert I. Grossman (2010)
 E. Mark Haacke (2004)
 Axel Haase (1991)
 Erwin Hahn (2016)
 R. Mark Henkelman (1998)
 Jürgen Hennig (1994)
 Waldo S. Hinshaw (1983)
 Chien Ho (2013)
 David I. Hoult (1985)
 Hedvig Hricak (2003)
 James S. Hyde (1999)
 James Hutchison (1988)
 Clifford R. Jack (2012)
 Ferenc A. Jolesz (2003)
 Robert M. Judd (2014)
 Raymond J. Kim (2014)
 Seymour Koenig (1990)
 Alan P. Koretsky (2002)
 Christiane K. Kuhl, M.D., Ph.D. (2015)
 Gerhard Laub (1993)
 Paul C. Lauterbur (1982, 1988) awarded by both predecessor societies, SMRM and SMRI
 Denis Le Bihan (2001)
 Vivian S. Lee (2019)
 Albert Macovski (1997)
 Sharmila Majumdar (2016)
 Peter Mansfield (1983, 1994) awarded by both predecessor societies, SMRM and SMRI
 Andrew Maudsley (2005)
 Michael T. Modic (1991)
 Michael E. Moseley (2001)
 Gil Navon (2016)
 Sarah J. Nelson (2019) (Deceased)
 Dwight G. Nishimura (2018)
 Seiji Ogawa (1995)
 John M. Pauly (2012)
 Martin R. Prince (2005)
 Klaas Pruessmann (2006)
 George K. Radda (1984)
 Stephen J. Riederer (2002)
 Peter B. Roemer (2009)
 Bruce R. Rosen (1997)
 Brian Ross (1995)
 John Schenck (2009)
 Mitchell D. Schnall (2013)
 A. Dean Sherry (2015)
 Robert G. Shulman (1984)
 Daniel K. Sodickson (2006)
 Francis W. Smith (1990)
 Kaori Togashi (2020)
 Robert Turner (2020)
 Kamil Ugurbil (1996)
 Jacob Valk (1999)
 Marjo van der Knaap (1999)
 Peter C.M. van Zijl (2007)
 Felix Wehrli (2017)
 Brian S. Worthington (1990)
 Ian R. Young (1988, 1989) awarded by both predecessor societies, SMRM and SMRI

References

Magnetic resonance imaging